The 2022–23 VCU Rams women's basketball team represents Virginia Commonwealth University during the 2022–23 NCAA Division I women's basketball season. It is the program's 49th season of existence, and their tenth season in the Atlantic 10 Conference. The Rams are led by ninth year head coach Beth O'Boyle and play their home games at the Stuart C. Siegel Center.

Roster

Schedule

|-
!colspan=12 style=| Globl Jam Tournament
|-

|-
!colspan=12 style=| Non-conference regular season
|-

|-
!colspan=12 style=|Atlantic 10 regular season
|-

|-

See also 
 2022–23 VCU Rams men's basketball team

References

External links 
 VCU Women's Basketball

VCU Rams women's basketball
VCU Rams women's basketball
VCU Rams women's basketball
VCU Rams women's basketball
VCU
VCU Rams women's basketball seasons